The 1986 VFL draft was the third formal draft to provide recruitment opportunities to clubs participating in Australian rules football's elite Victorian Football League. Held on 26 November 1986 after the end of the 1986 VFL season, it consisted only of the national draft itself, without a subsequent rookie or preseason draft.  It was the first draft to be held since two initial drafts in 1981 and 1982, and as drafts have been held every year since, it is considered to be the first of the modern drafts.

National draft
All twelve established clubs, along with one of the two teams set to debut in the competition, the Brisbane Bears, were given one pick in each of the five rounds, a total of 65 overall. Brisbane received the first selection in every round, and six pre-draft selections, as well as complete access to all players from Queensland.

The other new side, West Coast, was also granted similarly exclusive home-state rights. However, with the superior range of players available from the West Australian Football League (WAFL), the club was excluded from the draft.

The order of the remaining picks was set in the reverse of the previous season's finishing positions.

In addition, the established Victorian clubs maintained sole recruitment options on players from the relevant Metropolitan and, for the last time, Country Zones. This meant that even before the draft had started, the most sought-after footballers from Victoria were already signed, and therefore unavailable for selection.

The restricted pool of available draftees meant the majority of those chosen in the 1986 national draft came from South Australian and Tasmanian clubs. Meanwhile, although the minimum age for eligible players was 16, many were actually into their twenties, unlike the contemporary teenage selections. Also of note is the significant number of those picked either did not join the club that selected them at all, or at least did not do so straight away.  Players were aligned to their drafted club for three years, but could choose to remain playing for their current club outside of the VFL.

A prime example was the number one draft pick, Martin Leslie. Leslie served out the remaining two years of his contract with South Australian National Football League (SANFL) club Port Adelaide, winning All-Australian honours at the 1988 Adelaide Bicentennial Carnival in the process. Only then did he move to Brisbane, making his debut as a 26-year-old in 1989, winning the club's best-and-fairest twice and going on to play 107 games until his retirement in 1995. In contrast, the second selection overall, the similarly aged Steven Sims, opted to stay in the SANFL rather than join the St Kilda Football Club.

Many of the 1986 draftees never played in a senior VFL/AFL match, including 4 of the top 10 selections and all of Geelong and St Kilda's picks.  Several did go on to make their name as footballers, among them Melbourne's Steven Febey and Darrin Pritchard of Hawthorn. However, the most notable of the draft's recruits was Alastair Lynch, picked by Fitzroy at number 50 overall, who eventually passed the major milestone of 300 appearances, which included three victorious Grand Finals with the Brisbane Lions.

Pre-draft selections

National draft selections

References

Australian Football League draft
Vfl Draft, 1986
VFL Draft
VFL Draft